New York City's 5th City Council district is one of 51 districts in the New York City Council. It is currently represented by Democrat Julie Menin.

Geography
District 5 is based largely in Manhattan's Upper East Side, also covering Roosevelt Island and a small portion of East Harlem.

The district overlaps with Manhattan Community Boards 6, 8, and 11, and is contained almost entirely within New York's 12th congressional district with a small extension into the 13th district. It also overlaps with the 28th, 29th, and 30th districts of the New York State Senate, and with the 68th, 73rd, and 76th districts of the New York State Assembly.

Recent election results

2021
In 2019, voters in New York City approved Ballot Question 1, which implemented ranked-choice voting in all local elections. Under the new system, voters have the option to rank up to five candidates for every local office. Voters whose first-choice candidates fare poorly will have their votes redistributed to other candidates in their ranking until one candidate surpasses the 50 percent threshold. If one candidate surpasses 50 percent in first-choice votes, then ranked-choice tabulations will not occur.

2017

2013

References

New York City Council districts